Dylan O'Keeffe (born 4 February 1998) is an Australian racing driver currently competing in the TCR Australia Touring Car Series with Garry Rogers Motorsport, driving the No. 8 Peugeot 308.

Biography 
O'Keeffe started his career in karting before making his car-racing debut in the Victorian-based Porsche 944 Challenge in 2014. O'Keeffe attended St Bede's College (Mentone) during his secondary education.

Porsche GT3 Cup Challenge 
O'Keeffe competed in the Porsche GT3 Cup Challenge in 2015, driving for Ashley Seward Motorsport. He finished second overall in the standings with one race win and 12 top-three finishes.

Porsche Carrera Cup 
For the 2016 racing season, O'Keeffe progressed to the Porsche Carrera Cup, remaining with the Ashley Seward Motorsport team. He finished 10th in the points, with a best race result of fourth at the Hidden Valley round. He remained in Carrera Cup for the 2017 season, achieving top-three race finishes at Adelaide and Phillip Island, before recording a season-best second place at Malaysia's Sepang circuit. He finished sixth in the 2017 series standings.

O'Keeffe's final full season in Carrera Cup was in 2018. After recording his first race win at Sydney Motorsport Park and maiden round win at Darwin, O'Keeffe finished third in the standings.

In both 2017 and '18, O'Keeffe represented Australia at the Porsche Motorsport Junior Programme Shootout.

Bathurst 12 Hour 
O'Keeffe made his Bathurst 12 Hour debut in 2017, winning Class B and finishing 15th outright in a Steven Richards Motorsport Porsche. He returned to the event in 2018, driving an Audi R8 but the car was classified as a non-finisher. O'Keeffe made his third Bathurst 12 Hour start in 2019 driving a MARC car.

Super2 Series 
For the 2019 racing season, O'Keeffe was signed by Garry Rogers Motorsport to drive in the Super2 Series, replacing Chris Pither

Supercars Championship 
At the 2019 Gold Coast 600, O'Keeffe made his Supercars Championship racing debut for Garry Rogers Motorsport after Richie Stanaway was stood down from Race 27 for disciplinary reasons.

Career results

Complete Super2 Series results 
(key) (Round results only)

Supercars Championship results

Complete Bathurst 1000 results

TCR Australia results

Complete World Touring Car Cup results
(key) (Races in bold indicate pole position) (Races in italics indicate fastest lap)
 
‡ As O'Keeffe was a Wildcard entry, he was ineligible to score points.

Complete Bathurst 12 Hour results

Complete Bathurst 6 Hour results

References

External links

Profile on Racing Reference

1998 births
Living people
Australian racing drivers
Supercars Championship drivers
World Touring Car Cup drivers
Australian Endurance Championship drivers
Garry Rogers Motorsport drivers
Kelly Racing drivers